Streptomyces triticagri is a bacterium species from the genus of Streptomyces which has been isolated from rhizosphereic soil of the plant Triticum aestivum from Zhumadian in China.

See also 
 List of Streptomyces species

References 

triticagri
Bacteria described in 2020